This list of minor Negro league baseball teams consists of teams that played in the various minor Negro baseball leagues, as well as the independent teams, teams that played in proto-leagues and teams that played after integration. 

In Negro league baseball, organized major league play began in 1920, however informal "proto" leagues arose in the 1880s.  Most teams up to about 1920 were able to survive, and even profit, by barnstorming small towns and playing local semi-pro teams.  After 1920, most teams found financial security by forming leagues, but it was common for teams each season to play as many games outside of the league's schedule.  Generally, leagues in the north were major while leagues in the south were minor.

With the integration of Organized Baseball beginning 1946, Negro leagues lost elite players to white leagues causing former major Negro leagues to slip to minor league status, and historians do not consider any Negro league "major" after 1950.  By default, leagues established after integration are considered minor league, as is the one of two 1940s majors that continued after 1950. Also at this time, Negro leagues began to appear in the west.

Below are some of the better-documented leagues:

Proto-leagues
Southern League of Colored Base Ballists, 1886
National Colored Baseball League, 1887
International League of Independent Professional Base Ball Clubs, 1906.
National Association of Colored Baseball Clubs of the United States and Cuba, 1907–1909.

Minor leagues
 Texas Colored League/Texas–Oklahoma–Louisiana League/Texas–Louisiana Negro League, 1919–1931
 Negro Southern League (I), 1920–1936 – 
 Negro Southeastern League, 1921
 Interstate League, 1926 and 1940 (mixed-race league)
 Tri State League, 1935
 Negro American Association, 1939 and 1948–1949
 Negro Major League, 1942

Post-integration
 Negro Southern League (II), 1945–1951
 United States League, 1945–1946
 West Coast Negro Baseball Association, 1946
 East Texas Negro League, 1946
 Negro Texas League, 1949
 Negro American League, 1951–1960 – 
 Arkansas–Louisiana–Texas League, 1951
 Eastern Negro League, 1954
 Negro National Baseball Association, 1954

Below is the list of minor Negro league teams.  Teams in bold are considered to have been of major league caliber for at least one season of their existence. Other teams included in this list were either a semi-pro, barnstorming or traveling team and not necessarily a member of a league.

Alabama

Arkansas

California

Colorado

Connecticut

District of Columbia

Florida

Georgia

Illinois

Indiana

Kansas

Kentucky

Louisiana

Maryland

Massachusetts

Michigan

Minnesota

Missouri

New Jersey

New York

Ohio

Oklahoma

Oregon

Pennsylvania

Tennessee

Texas

Washington

Traveling teams

References

External links
 Leagues & Teams at the Negro Leagues Baseball Museum
 The Negro League Teams at the Negro League Baseball Players Association
 Negro Leagues Database at Seamheads.com
 Negro League Team Encyclopedia at Baseball-Reference.com

Negro league baseball teams
Negro league baseball
 
minor Negro league